|}

The Betfair Chase is a Grade 1 National Hunt steeplechase in Great Britain which is open to horses aged five years or older. It is run at Haydock Park over a distance of about 3 miles and  furlongs (3 miles 1 furlong and 125 yards, or 5,143 metres), and during its running there are nineteen fences to be jumped. The race is scheduled to take place each year in November.

History
The event was established in 2005, and it originally served as the first part of a bonus scheme called the Betfair Million. Its sponsor, Betfair, offered a sum of £1,000,000 to leading contenders for successful performances in two subsequent races.

The initial version of the Betfair Million was awarded if the winner of the Betfair Chase went on to win both the King George VI Chase and the Cheltenham Gold Cup. The Lexus Chase was included as an alternative second leg for the next two years, and Kauto Star won the prize by taking the original route in 2006–07. The format was changed in 2008–09, when the bonus became available to any first-three finisher achieving first or second at the Cheltenham Festival and then winning the Grand National. The Betfair Million was dropped the following year. The £1,000,000 bonus returned as the "Chase Triple Crown" in 2015 when Jockey Club Racecourses offered it to any horse winning the race, the King George VI Chase and Cheltenham Gold Cup. Cue Card won the first two legs of the 2015–16 bonus but fell when in contention at Cheltenham. Since 2016 the Kauto Star Trophy has been awarded to the owner of a horse completing the Chase Triple Crown.

The Betfair Chase is familiarly known by its sponsored name, but its registered title is the Lancashire Chase. It is now the first Grade 1 event of the British National Hunt season. Prior to 2017 it was run over a distance of about 3 miles. The distance was increased to allow a longer run from the start to the first bend.

The original Lancashire Chase was first run at Manchester Racecourse in 1884.

Records
Most successful horse (4 wins):
 Kauto Star – 2006, 2007, 2009, 2011

Leading jockey (4 wins):
 Ruby Walsh – Kauto Star (2006, 2009, 2011), Silvianaco Conti (2012)

Leading trainer (6 wins):
 Paul Nicholls – Kauto Star (2006, 2007, 2009, 2011), Silvianaco Conti (2012, 2014)

Winners

See also
 Horse racing in Great Britain
 List of British National Hunt races

References

 Racing Post:

 pedigreequery.com – Lancashire Chase – Haydock Park.

National Hunt races in Great Britain
Haydock Park Racecourse
National Hunt chases
Recurring sporting events established in 2005
2005 establishments in England